Established in 2001, the Emil Artin Junior Prize in Mathematics is presented usually every year to a  former student of an Armenian university, who is under the age of thirty-five, for outstanding contributions in algebra, geometry, topology,
and number theory. The award is announced in the Notices of the American Mathematical Society. The prize is named after Emil Artin, who was of Armenian descent. Although eligibility for  the prize is not fully international, as the recipient has to have studied in Armenia, awards are made only for specific outstanding publications in leading international journals.

Recipient of the Emil Artin Junior Prize
2001 Vahagn Mikaelian 
2002 Artur Barkhudaryan
2004 Gurgen R. Asatryan
2005 Mihran Papikian
2007 Ashot Minasyan
2008 Nansen Petrosyan
2009 Grigor Sargsyan
2010 Hrant Hakobyan
2011 Lilya Budaghyan
2014 Sevak Mkrtchyan
2015 Anush Tserunyan
2016 Lilit Martirosyan
2018 Davit Harutyunyan
2019 Vahagn Aslanyan
2020 Levon Haykazyan
2021 Arman Darbinyan
2022 Diana Davidova
2023 Davit Karagulyan

See also
 List of mathematics awards

References

Mathematics awards